Goubangzi is a town in Beizhen, Liaoning Province, China.

It is located on the modern Beijing–Harbin Railway. It was an important rail junction in the late 19th century, with several spurs connecting to the mainline at the station.

See also
 Goubangzi station

Notes

Towns in Liaoning
Divisions of Beizhen